Jan Mohammed may refer to:
Jan Mohammed Khan, former governor of Uruzgan province in Afghanistan
Jan Muhammad Khan, Mughal faujdar of Sylhet
Jon Mohammad Barakzai, former detainee at Guantanamo Bay detention camp
Jan Mohammad Jamali, politician from Jaffarabad, Balochistan, Pakistan
Jan Mohammad, Pakistani film director